Giannino Andreossi (2 July 1902 – 22 May 1964) was a Swiss ice hockey player who competed in the 1928 Winter Olympics. He was a member of the Swiss ice hockey team, which won the bronze medal.

References

External links
 

1902 births
1964 deaths
Ice hockey players at the 1928 Winter Olympics
Medalists at the 1928 Winter Olympics
Olympic bronze medalists for Switzerland
Olympic ice hockey players of Switzerland
Olympic medalists in ice hockey